The Rapid Support Forces are Sudanese paramilitary forces operated by the Sudanese Government. The RSF grew out of, and is primarily composed of, the Janjaweed militias which fought on behalf of the Sudanese government during the War in Darfur, killing and raping civilians and burning their houses. The RSF's actions in Darfur qualify as crimes against humanity according to Human Rights Watch.

The RSF are administered by the National Intelligence and Security Service, although during military operations they are commanded by the Sudanese Armed Forces. , the commander of the RSF is General Mohamed Hamdan Dagalo ("Hemetti"). During the Sudanese political crisis of 2019, the military junta who took control of the country employed the RSF to violently crack down on pro-democracy demonstrators. Along with other security forces, the RSF carried out the Khartoum massacre on 3 June 2019.

Origin
The RSF has its roots in the Janjaweed militias used by the Sudanese Government in its attempts to fight the anti-government insurgency during the War in Darfur. The RSF was officially formed in August 2013 under the command of the NISS, following a restructuring and reactivation of Janjaweed militias in order to combat rebel groups in Darfur region, South Kordofan, and the Blue Nile states, following joint attacks by Sudanese Revolutionary Front rebels in North and South Kordofan in April 2013.

Leadership and numbers
The RSF is headed by Mohamed Hamdan Dagalo ("Hemetti"), who has been its leader since it was created in 2013 or 2014. , Hemetti's brother Abdul Rahim Hamdan Dagalo is deputy head of the RSF.

The RSF was estimated by Human Rights Watch as having about 5,0006,000 soldiers in February 2014 in Darfur. In 2016–2017, the RSF had 40,000 members participating in the Yemeni Civil War. In late October 2019, 10,000 had returned to Sudan. In July 2019, about 1,000 RSF soldiers were present in Libya, supporting the Libyan National Army commanded by Khalifa Haftar.

Role

Migration control
In addition to its role in Darfur, the RSF is also deployed to patrol the border with Libya and round up Eritrean and Ethiopian refugees in response to the Khartoum process, which is an initiative between European and African states, including Sudan, to stem the flow of migrants to Europe.

Business interests
In November 2017, Hemetti used the RSF to take over control of gold mines in the Darfur region, which led to him becoming one of the richest people in Sudan by 2019. Hemetti's brother Abdul Rahim, deputy head of the RSF, heads the Al Junaid (or Al Gunade) corporation involved in gold mining and trading in Sudan.

In December 2019, a Global Witness investigation into the RSF and Al Junaid argued that the RSF and Al Junaid are closely linked in terms of financial transactions.  Global Witness stated that "the RSF and [Al Junaid had] captured a swathe of the [Sudanese] gold industry and [were] likely using it to fund their operations." The General Manager of Al Junaid stated to Thomson Reuters that there were no close links between the two.

The RSF has two front companies called GSK, a small Sudanese technology company, and Tradive General Trading LLC, a United Arab Emirates-based company, both controlled by Hemetti's brother Algoney Hamdan Dagalo.

War in Darfur

During the War in Darfur, in 2014 and 2015, RSF "repeatedly attacked villages, burned and looted homes, beating, raping and executing villagers," aided by air and ground support from the Sudanese Armed Forces. The RSF executions and rapes typically took place in villages after rebels had left. The attacks were systematic enough to qualify as crimes against humanity according to Human Rights Watch.

International civil wars

Libyan Civil War
During the 2019 Western Libya offensive phase of the Second Libyan Civil War, in July 2019, about 1000 RSF soldiers were present in Libya, supporting the Libyan National Army (LNA) commanded by Khalifa Haftar and based in Tobruk, which was fighting against the internationally recognised Government of National Accord (GNA) based in Tripoli.

Yemeni Civil War
The RSF has participated in the Yemeni Civil War (2015–present), supporting the pro-Hadi forces. Both the RSF and other Sudanese security forces, participating in the Saudi Arabian-led intervention in Yemen, have killed civilians and destroyed infrastructure, for which they are suspected of war crimes by Human Rights Watch.

In 2016–2017, the RSF had  members participating in the Yemeni Civil War. In late October 2019,  had returned to Sudan.

2018–19 Sudanese protests and human rights abuses
The RSF killed 100 protestors, injured 500, raped women and pillaged homes in the Khartoum massacre on 3 June 2019 during the 2018–19 Sudanese protests.  During the first day of Eid al-Fitr in Sudan, in early June 2019, there were several reports that the RSF tied bricks of cement to the bodies of dead protestors to make them sink to the bottom of the Nile and never be found. The Central Committee of Medical Doctors stated that more than 100 people had been killed. On 6 June 2019, Kumi Naidoo, the head of Amnesty International, called for the "[immediate withdrawal of] all members of the Rapid Support Forces from policing and law enforcement anywhere in Sudan and especially in Khartoum".

In addition to the killings in Khartoum, other human rights violations during the 2018-19 crisis have been attributed to the RSF, including the rape of 70 male and female protesters during the Khartoum massacre and the following days; the targeting of peaceful sit-ins; and attacks on several hospitals.

The Central Committee of Sudanese Doctors reported Janjaweed/RSF shooting dead nine people in the market of the village al-Dalij (or al-Delig) in Central Darfur on 10 or 11/12 June 2019. The massacre and the burning down of the market were interpreted by locals as a response to civil disobedience.

References

External links
Official RSF Facebook

2013 establishments in Sudan
Military of Sudan
Military units and formations established in 2013
Organisations of the Sudanese Revolution
Paramilitary organisations based in Sudan